Chakkala Nair, also known as Vattakkat Nair, and Vaniya Nair is one of the intermediate subcastes of the Nair community. They are distributed throughout Kerala. In Travancore, they are known as Chakkala, while in Cochin and Malabar they are Vattakattu and In the extreme north of Malabar they are called Vaniya

Vattakattu Nairs are now indistinguishable from other Nair subcastes through alliances with other Nair communities and is treated as part of the mainstream Nair community by the government of Kerala

According to eminent scholars Thunchaththu Ezhuthachan was born in a Chakkala Nair family of Thrikkandiyoor Amsam in Vettathunadu

Chakkala Kaali Nair also known as Kunchirakottu kaaliyan a close associate of Iravikkutti Pillai and a warrior who was made famous by ballads of Venad belonged to Chakkala Nair caste.

See also
Sanskritisation

References

Nair